Waggoner may refer to:

People
 Wagoner (surname), a list of people named Wagoner, Waggoner or Waggonner
 Waggoner Carr (1918–2004), American politician

Places in the United States
 Waggoner, Illinois, a village
 Waggoner Ranch, a large historic ranch in northwest Texas
 Waggoner Ranch Formation, a geologic formation in Texas
 Waggoner Airport, a private airport on the Bell Ranch, Tucumcari, New Mexico

Buildings in the United States
 Daniel Waggoner Log House and Barn, a historic home in Centre County, Pennsylvania
 Waggoner Mansion in Decatur, Texas
 W. T. Waggoner Building, a skyscraper in Fort Worth, Texas

Companies
 Waggoner National Bank of Vernon, a bank in Texas

See also
 
 Wagner (disambiguation)